"Hasta la vista, baby" is a catchphrase from the film Terminator 2: Judgment Day.

Hasta la vista, baby may also refer to:
Hasta la Vista, Baby! (Skin album), 1998
Hasta la Vista Baby! (U2 album), 2000

See also
Hasta la vista (disambiguation)